Greg Eslinger (born April 23, 1983) is a former American college and professional American football center.  He played college football for the University of Minnesota, received consensus All-American honors, and was recognized as the best college interior lineman and top college center.  He was chosen by the Denver Broncos in the sixth round of the 2006 NFL Draft, and was a member of several National Football League (NFL) teams, but never played in a regular season NFL game.

College career
A Bismarck, North Dakota native, Eslinger attended the University of Minnesota, where he was a four-year starter for the Minnesota Golden Gophers football team from 2002 to 2005.  He was a three-time first-team All-Big Ten selection (2003, 2004, 2005) and an unanimous All-American in 2005.  As a senior in 2005, he was awarded the Outland Trophy, which is given to college football's best interior lineman, as well as the Dave Rimington Trophy, awarded to college football's top center.

Awards and honors
 Sporting News Freshman All-American (2002)
 Third-team All-American (2003)
 First-team All-Big Ten (2003–2005)
 FWAA All-American (2004)
 Rimington Trophy finalist (2004)
 Big Ten Offensive Lineman of the Year (2005)
 Lombardi Award semifinalist (2005)
 Consensus All-American (2005)
 Outland Trophy (2005)
 Rimington Trophy (2005)

Professional career
The Denver Broncos chose Eslinger in the sixth round (198th overall pick) of the 2006 NFL Draft.  He was on their injured reserve list and did not play during the 2006 NFL season.  Assigned to the Cologne Centurions of the NFL Europa for 2007, he started at center and earned All-NFL Europa honors.  The Broncos moved Eslinger to the practice squad at the beginning of 2007.  On Nov. 13, 2007, the Cleveland Browns picked him off the Bronco practice squad.  On December 12, 2007, he was released from the Cleveland Browns.  On December 20, 2007, he was signed to the Houston Texans practice squad.  Eslinger was re-signed to the Bronco practice squad in the 2008 season.

References

External links
 NFL Europa profile

1983 births
Living people
All-American college football players
American football centers
Cologne Centurions (NFL Europe) players
Cleveland Browns players
Denver Broncos players
Houston Texans players
Minnesota Golden Gophers football players
Sportspeople from Bismarck, North Dakota
Players of American football from North Dakota